Barney O'Shaughnessy (28 February 1912 – 27 May 2007) was an Australian cricketer who played a single first-class match for Western Australia. Born in the isolated Mid-West town of Wiluna, Western Australia, where his family managed a hotel, O'Shaughnessy was sent to Perth for schooling, attending Christian Brothers' College as a boarder. Playing as a fast bowler and attacking batsman, he played cricket for the school in the Darlot Cup, and also captained the school's football team in 1931, his final year at the school. In one match, against Scotch College in November 1931, O'Shaughnessy scored a century, 100 runs exactly, from 65 minutes of batting, including seven sixes and nine fours.

O'Shaughnessy's single match for Western Australia was against the Marylebone Cricket Club on their 1932–33 tour of Australia. In the match, held at the WACA Ground in late October 1932, he opened Western Australia's bowling alongside Ron Halcombe in both innings, taking 0/50 in the first and 1/31 in the second innings. His only wicket was that of Leslie Ames, who he bowled for 19 runs. He batted at number ten in Western Australia's only innings, and scored a duck. O'Shaughnessy returned to Wiluna in 1933 to take over the Club Hotel, which his family had previously run. During the Second World War, O'Shaughnessy enlisted in the Australian Army, along with several other sportsmen from Western Australia. He served as a private in the 2/1 Guard Regiment, and was discharged in November 1944. O'Shaughnessy eventually retired to Perth, dying in Nedlands in May 2007, at the age of 95.

See also
 List of Western Australia first-class cricketers

References

1912 births
2007 deaths
Australian Army soldiers
Australian cricketers
Australian Army personnel of World War II
Australian people of Irish descent
Cricketers from Western Australia
People educated at Christian Brothers' College, Perth
People from Wiluna, Western Australia
Western Australia cricketers